Missy Mazzoli (born October 27, 1980) is an American composer and pianist who is a member of the composition faculty at the Mannes College of Music. She has received critical acclaim for her chamber, orchestral and operatic work. In 2018 she became one of the first two women to receive a commission from the Metropolitan Opera House. She is the founder and keyboardist for Victoire, an electro-acoustic band dedicated to performing her music. From 2012-2015 she was composer-in-residence at Opera Philadelphia, in collaboration with Gotham Chamber Opera and Music-Theater Group. Her music is published by G. Schirmer. Mazzoli received a 2015 Foundation for Contemporary Arts Grants to Artists Award, a Fulbright Grant to the Netherlands, and in 2018 was nominated for a Grammy Award in the category of Best Classical Composition. In 2018, Mazzoli was named for a two-season term as the Mead Composer-in-Residence with the Chicago Symphony Orchestra. Mazzoli was named the Bragg Artist-in-Residence at Mount Allison University beginning in 2022.

Education
Mazzoli was born in Lansdale, Pennsylvania. She received a bachelor's degree from Boston University's College of Fine Arts, a master's degree from the Yale School of Music in 2006, and additionally studied at the Royal Conservatory of the Hague. Her teachers include David Lang, Louis Andriessen, Aaron Jay Kernis, Martin Bresnick, Martijn Padding, and John Harbison.

In 2006 Mazzoli taught composition in the music department of Yale University, and in 2013 was a guest lecturer at New York University. From 2007 to 2010 was executive director of the MATA Festival in New York City, an organization dedicated to promoting the work of young composers.

Concert works and recordings
Mazzoli's music has been performed by the Kronos Quartet, eighth blackbird, the Minnesota Orchestra, violinist Jennifer Koh, cellist Maya Beiser, pianist Emanuel Ax, NOW Ensemble, Los Angeles Opera, Cincinnati Opera, the Los Angeles Philharmonic, the Chicago Symphony, the American Composers Orchestra, the South Carolina Philharmonic, Dublin's Crash Ensemble, ETHEL and many others in venues including Carnegie Hall and the Sydney Opera House. From 2012-2015 she was composer-in-residence with the Opera Philadelphia, Gotham Chamber Opera and Music Theatre-Group, and in 2011/12 was composer/educator in residence with the Albany Symphony.

Mazzoli has released three full-length albums of her music to date: Cathedral City, written for her band Victoire (2010), Song from the Uproar, the original cast recording of her first opera (2012), and Vespers for a New Dark Age (2015), a work for her band Victoire in collaboration with percussionist Glenn Kotche (of Wilco) and vocalists Martha Cluver, Melissa Hughes and Virginia Kelsey. Vespers for a New Dark Age was commissioned by Carnegie Hall and premiered there in February 2014. All of Mazzoli's records were released on Brooklyn-based label New Amsterdam Records.

Operatic works

SALT
A 20-minute retelling of the story of Lot's wife for voice, cello and electronics, SALT was performed at the 2012 BAM Next Wave Festival in Brooklyn and at UNC Chapel Hill. Composed for cellist Maya Beiser and vocalist Helga Davis, SALT was directed by Robert Woodruff and includes text by Erin Cressida Wilson.

Song from the Uproar
Mazzoli's first opera, Song from the Uproar: The Lives and Deaths of Isabelle Eberhardt, based on the life of Swiss explorer and writer Isabelle Eberhardt, premiered at New York venue The Kitchen in March 2012. The piece was created in collaboration with librettist Royce Vavrek, filmmaker Stephen Taylor and director Gia Forakis. The Wall Street Journal called this work "powerful and new" and The New York Times said that "in the electric surge of Ms. Mazzoli's score you felt the joy, risk, and limitless potential of free spirits unbound."

On November 13, 2012, the original cast recording of Song from the Uproar was released on New Amsterdam Records. In October 2015 LA Opera presented the second full production as part of their "Off Grand" series at REDCAT.

Breaking the Waves
Mazzoli's opera Breaking the Waves, an adaptation of Lars von Trier's 1996 Cannes Grand Prix-winning film Breaking the Waves, with a libretto by Royce Vavrek, was commissioned by Opera Philadelphia and Beth Morrison Projects. The opera premiered in Philadelphia on September 22, 2016 gaining many positive reviews. Opera News wrote that "Breaking the Waves stands among the best 21st-century American operas yet produced.". Heidi Waleson in her review for The Wall Street Journal wrote: "Mr. Vavrek's spare, eloquent libretto leaves ample space for Ms. Mazzoli's music to create a complex portrait of Bess and her stark environment. … Ms. Mazzoli's score deftly balances trenchant arias with a kaleidoscopic orchestration whose layers and colors suggest Messiaen, Britten and Janáček but is finally all her own." The opera was nominated for the 2017 International Opera Award for Best World Premiere, and won the inaugural Music Critics Association of North America Award for Best New Opera in 2017. In 2019 Scottish Opera announced it would present Breaking the Waves on a world tour beginning at the 2019 Edinburgh International Festival, in a new production directed by Tom Morris.

Proving Up
In 2018, Mazzoli premiered Proving Up, her third opera with librettist Royce Vavrek, an adaptation of Karen Russell's short story of the same title. The work was commissioned by Washington National Opera, Opera Omaha and Miller Theatre. and was written for baritone John Moore and Grammy-nominated soprano Talise Trevigne. The opera was called “harrowing…powerful…a true opera of our time” by the Washington Post and “brilliant” by Musical America. It will be performed in the Lyric Opera of Chicago's 2021-2022 season.

The Listeners
In 2022, Mazzoli premiered The Listeners, her fourth opera with librettist Royce Vavrek, at the Oslo Opera House in Norway. The work was commissioned by Opera Philadelphia and Lyric Opera of Chicago, and was staged with Norwegian National Opera for the premiere.

Movies and television
Mazzoli wrote and performed several songs for the soundtrack of the acclaimed classical music exposé, Mozart in the Jungle, most notably "Impromptu", and other work presented within the show's continuity as by character Thomas Pembridge, retired conductor of the (fictional) New York Symphony.

Critical reception
Mazzoli was described by The New York Times as "one of the more consistently inventive and surprising composers now working in New York", and by Time Out New York as "Brooklyn's post-millennial Mozart". On November 23, 2012 and March 28, 2015, Mazzoli was a guest on NPR's All Things Considered.

Mazzoli is the recipient of four ASCAP Young Composer Awards, a Fulbright Grant to the Netherlands, the Detroit Symphony's Elaine Lebenbom Award, and grants from the Jerome Foundation, American Music Center, and the Barlow Endowment.

After the LA premiere of her first opera, Song from the Uproar, Mark Swed of the Los Angeles Times wrote that "Her wonderful score is seductive, meditative, spiritually elusive and subversive. With it, we can welcome a new natural for the art form."

Awards and nominations

References

External links
 
 
 

1980 births
American women classical composers
American classical composers
American opera composers
Women opera composers
Boston University College of Fine Arts alumni
Living people
Musicians from Brooklyn
Royal Conservatory of The Hague alumni
Yale School of Music alumni
Yale School of Music faculty
21st-century American composers
21st-century classical composers
People from Lansdale, Pennsylvania
21st-century American women musicians
Classical musicians from New York (state)
Women music educators
21st-century women composers